is a Japanese retired figure skater. She is the 2010–11 Grand Prix Final bronze medalist, 2014 Four Continents champion, 2010 World Junior champion, 2009–10 JGP Final champion, and a four-time Japanese national medalist (bronze in 2010, 2011; silver in 2012, 2013).

Personal life
Murakami was born on November 7, 1994 in Naka-ku, Nagoya.

Career

Early career
Making her first international appearance, Murakami won the silver medal in the spring girls category at the Mladost Trophy in the 2004–05 season.

In the 2005–06 season, she won silver at the 2005–06 Japan Novice Championships in the Novice B category, which is the lower of the novice levels. This medal earned her a trip to compete in the spring competition, the Gardena Spring Trophy, which she won on the novice level. Murakami competed at the 2006–07 Japan Novice Championships in the Novice A category and placed 7th, and at the 2007–08 Japan Novice Championships in the Novice A category, she placed 5th.

2008–09 season: Junior international debut

Murakami debuted on the ISU Junior Grand Prix. She won the bronze medal at her first event in Madrid, Spain. At her second event, in Sheffield, England, she won the competition. She was the 4th qualifier for the 2008–09 ISU Junior Grand Prix Final.

Prior to the JGP Final, Murakami competed at the 2008–09 Japan Junior Championships, which served both as the junior national championships and the qualifier for the Japanese team to the World Junior Championships. Murakami placed 7th in the short program and won the free skating to take the bronze medal, which earned her an invitation to compete at the 2008–09 senior national championships. However, as Japan had earned only two berths to the 2009 World Junior Championships, Murakami did not qualify.

At the JGP Final, she placed 2nd in the short program and 3rd in the free skating to place 4th overall. Following the Final, Murakami competed at the 2008–09 Japan Championships, where she placed 7th in the short program, 8th in the free skating, and 7th overall.

2009–10 season: JGP Final and World Junior title

In the 2009–10 season, Murakami competed on the 2009–10 ISU Junior Grand Prix and won both her events to qualify for the 2009–10 Junior Grand Prix Final. And she won a gold medal at the JGP Final.

At the 2009–10 Japan Junior Championships, she won both segments of the competition to win the title overall. 
The win qualified her for the 2009–10 Japan Championship, where she placed fifth overall, behind Mao Asada, Akiko Suzuki, Yukari Nakano, and Miki Ando.

She was assigned to compete at the 2010 World Junior Championships, where she won the title after placing second in the short program and first in the free skating.

2010–11 season: Senior debut
Murakami moved up to the senior ISU Grand Prix for the 2010–11 season. Her assignments for the 2010–11 ISU Grand Prix season were the 2010 NHK Trophy and the 2010 Skate America.

At the 2010 NHK Trophy, she placed second in the short program behind Carolina Kostner, and fifth in the free skating to capture the bronze medal. During both programs, she landed a triple toe-triple toe combination cleanly. At the 2010 Skate America, she placed second in the short program after singling her double Axel. She placed second in the free skate behind Rachael Flatt and won the gold medal.

Murakami qualified for the 2010–11 Grand Prix Final. She placed third in the short program and second in the free skate on her way to the bronze medal.

2011–12 season
In the 2011–12 Grand Prix season, Murakami finished sixth overall at the 2011 Cup of China and fourth at the 2011 Trophée Éric Bompard. She earned her second consecutive bronze medal at the 2011 Japan Championships.

Murakami placed fourth at the 2012 Four Continents Championships and fifth at the 2012 World Championships.

She was part of the ladies' team representing Japan at the 2012 ISU World Team Trophy. She placed 3rd in the short program but 8th in the free skating and finished 6th overall.

2012–13 season
Murakami started her season with bronze at the 2012 Skate Canada International and finished 4th at her next event, the 2012 Cup of Russia. She placed second at the 2012–13 Japan Championships.

She won the bronze medal in her third appearance at the 2013 Four Continents Championships with fellow Japanese medalists Mao Asada and Akiko Suzuki taking the gold and silver medal respectively.

Murakami finished 4th at the 2013 World Championships setting a personal best score of 189.73 points.

2013–14 season: Four Continents champion
Murakami finished 4th at her first Grand Prix event of the season, the 2013 Cup of China, and then 7th at the 2013 Rostelecom Cup. At 2013–14 Japan Championships, she finished second behind Akiko Suzuki. After the event, she began wearing new boots which caused swelling in her right ankle.

Murakami won the 2014 Four Continents Championships setting a new personal best overall score of 196.91 points, as well as a personal best in the free skating with 132.18 points. At her Olympic debut in Sochi, Russia, Murakami placed 15th in the short program, 12th in the free skating, and placed 12th overall. She finished 10th at the 2014 World Championships.

2014–15 season
Murakami started off her season by competing at Japan Open, where she placed 4th in the ladies' event and Team Japan finished 3rd overall. She then won a medal on the Grand Prix series, taking bronze at the 2014 Cup of China after placing third in both segments. At the 2014 NHK Trophy, she finished 4th after placing 3rd in the short program and 7th in the free skating. With those results, she was the third alternate for the 2014-15 Grand Prix Final.

At the 2014–15 Japan Championships, Murakami placed 9th in the short program, 4th in the free skate, and fourth overall. She was selected to compete at the 2015 World Championships due to her placements in her Grand Prix events. At Worlds, she placed 4th in the short program, 8th in the free skate and 7th overall, earning season's best scores in all segments.

Murakami then competed at 2015 World Team Trophy where she finished 6th and Team Japan placed third overall. After twisting her ankle during an ice show in late April 2015, she cancelled the rest of her post-season skating appearances.

2015–16 season
Murakami resumed regular training in September 2015. She began her season on the Challenger Series, placing 7th at the U.S. Classic. Her Grand Prix assignments were the 2015 Skate Canada International and 2015 Trophée Éric Bompard. She finished fourth at both events. In France, the second day of competition was cancelled due to the Paris attacks and the short program standings were deemed the final results.

Murakami placed 6th at the Japanese Championships and 7th at the 2016 Four Continents.

2016–17 season
Murakami performed an exhibition program as a special guest at the 2017 World Team Trophy and announced her retirement.

Endorsements and public life
Murakami is sponsored by Adidas Japan, All Nippon Airways (ANA), Nichirei, Brother Industries, Otsuka Pharmaceutical Co., and Nippon Menard Cosmetic Co., Ltd, in addition to several local companies.

Following her win at the 2010 World Junior Championships, Murakami has taken part in many local events including the first pitch ceremony of Chunichi Dragons, a professional baseball team based in Nagoya.

Programs

Competitive highlights
 GP: Grand Prix; CS: Challenger Series; JGP: Junior Grand Prix

Detailed results

Small medals for short program and free skating awarded only at ISU Championships.

Senior results

Junior results

Novice results

References

 Ice Challenge Senior Ladies results
 2006–07 Japan Novice Championships
 2007–08 Japan Novice Championships

External links 

 kanako-murakami.com 
 

1994 births
Living people
Asian Games gold medalists for Japan
Asian Games medalists in figure skating
Figure skaters at the 2011 Asian Winter Games
Figure skaters at the 2014 Winter Olympics
Four Continents Figure Skating Championships medalists
Japanese female single skaters
Medalists at the 2011 Asian Winter Games
Olympic figure skaters of Japan
Figure skaters from Nagoya
World Junior Figure Skating Championships medalists